is a Japanese voice actress.

Notable roles

Anime television
 Anpanman – Onion Demon
 Bakusō Kyōdai Let's & Go!! – As R
 Highschool! Kimen-gumi – Hiro as a child
 Domain of Murder – Sayoko Tōyama
 Plawres Sanshiro – Kyōko Fubuki
 Fist of the North Star – Airi
 Noozles – Sandy

OVA
 Eternal Filena – Filena
 JoJo's Bizarre Adventure – Holly Kujo
 Dōkyūsei – Mako Saitō
 Fight! Iczer One – Sepia
 RG Veda – Kendappa-ō
 Cream Lemon - Kyōko Terasawa, Rie Komatsuzaki, Yulia, Mako, Arisa Ayukawa

Anime films
 Fist of the North Star – Airi

Dubbing
 Dragon Fist – Zhuang Meng-lan (Nora Miao)

References

External links

1961 births
Japanese voice actresses
Living people
Voice actresses from Tokyo
20th-century Japanese actresses
21st-century Japanese actresses
81 Produce voice actors